Studio K may refer to:

Knott's Berry Farm attraction 1984-1991
The Studio K Show in 2017 based on Studio K interstitials